Horbury Millfield Road railway station served the village of Horbury, West Yorkshire, England from 1927 to 1961 on the Manchester and Leeds Railway.

History 
The station was opened on 11 July 1927 by the London, Midland and Scottish Railway. It replaced . It was situated opposite St Mary's Church and was closer to Horbury railway works than Horbury Junction. It closed on 6 November 1961.

References 

Disused railway stations in West Yorkshire
Former London, Midland and Scottish Railway stations
Railway stations in Great Britain opened in 1927
Railway stations in Great Britain closed in 1961
1927 establishments in England
1961 disestablishments in England